Remix Hits is the first remix album by Brazilian pop singer Kelly Key, released on April 2, 2002, by Warner Music.

Track listing

Certifications

References

2002 remix albums
Kelly Key albums
Electropop remix albums